Antoine Joujou (born 12 March 2003) is a French professional footballer who plays as a midfielder for Le Havre.

Club career
Joujou is a youth product of Melun, Évry, Sénart-Moissy, Cesson VSD, and CS Brétigny before moving to the reserves of Le Havre on 10 July 2020. He made his senior and professional debut with Le Havre as a late substitute in a 3–1 Ligue 2 win over Nîmes on 13 January 2023, assisting his side's third goal. On 2 February, 2023, he signed his first professional contract with the club until 2026.

References

External links
 

2003 births
Living people
People from Mantes-la-Jolie
French footballers
Association football midfielders
Le Havre AC players
Ligue 2 players
Championnat National 3 players